Dear Audrey is a 2021 documentary film directed by Jeremiah Hayes. The film centres on activist and filmmaker Martin Duckworth, as he cares for his wife Audrey Schirmer through the later stages of Alzheimer’s disease.

Synopsis 
One of Canada's most prolific documentary filmmakers, Martin Duckworth is also known as a devoted peace activist. But when his wife Audrey Schirmer was diagnosed with Alzhiemer's in 2013, he stopped making films in order to care for her full time. 

Dear Audrey revisits those moments using excerpts from Martin’s films and Audrey’s photography. As Audrey's condition degrades, Martin's involvement and love grow stronger. Their daughter Jacqueline, a person with autism spectrum disorder, also struggles with her mother’s illness, but Martin is devoted to making his wife and daughter's lives meaningful.

Production and release 
Dear Audrey is a co-production between Cineflix Media, the National Film Board of Canada, and SwingDog Films.

Filming began in 2016 and continued over the next four years with Hayes shooting once or twice a month at Martin's home. During this time, there was no source of outside funding. After four years of shooting, Hayes edited half of the film in order to make a short promo video to use to raise interest with producers in order to finish the film. In winter 2020, Cineflix Media and the National Film Board of Canada became the film's co-producers.

Dear Audrey combines footage shot in Martin and Audrey's Montreal apartment, Audrey's black and white photography, clips from some of Martin Duckworth's thirty documentaries, period archives, and black and white animation. The music was composed by Walker Grimshaw.

The film debuted on November 19, 2021 at the Montreal International Documentary Festival (RIDM), and toured film festivals throughout Canada and internationally.

Reception

Critical response 
Charlie Smith of The Georgia Straight said, “Martin Duckworth spent decades telling other people's truths. But the former NFB director is actually in front of the camera for some of his most compelling and candid moments in cinema... Anyone who watches Dear Audrey will undoubtedly conclude that Hayes is a masterful filmmaker”.

Dorothy Woodend of The Tyee gave a positive review saying, “The central force of Dear Audrey is the eternal, almost implacable force of love that binds people together through the most difficult times. It is this energy, emanating out in a thousand small ways, that lies at  the heart of the film. Mysterious and ordinary, invisible yet  undeniable.”

Silvia Galipeau of La Presse also reviewed the film positively : “It's impossible to watch 90 minutes of this documentary, without being overwhelmed by its sweetness and generosity. Through this very beautiful film, about this so beautiful love”.

Janet Smith of Stir Vancouver said, "Hayes’s patience pays off in many small, but profound moments over the course of the film... Hayes has crafted a film that shifts the thinking around Alzheimer’s: that it is not a sentence of darkness and hopelessness. That there can be tenderness and dignity within the journey".

Awards 

 2021 Montreal International Documentary Festival (RIDM), People's Choice Award  
 2022 Indy Film Fest, Best Feature Documentary Award
 2022 Sherbrooke World Film Festival, Cercle d’or for Best Feature Documentary Award
 2022 Tokyo Film Awards, Silver Award for Best Feature Documentary
 2022 Phoenix Film Festival, Dr. Sydney K. Shapiro Humanitarian Award
 2022 Madrid International Film Festival, Best Editing of a Documentary Award
 2022 Docs Without Borders Film Festival, Excellence in Editing Award

It received three Canadian Screen Award nominations at the 11th Canadian Screen Awards in 2023, for Best Feature Length Documentary, Best Editing in a Documentary (Hayes) and Best Original Music in a Documentary (Walker Grimshaw).

References

External links 

Documentary films about film directors and producers
Canadian documentary films
2021 documentary films
Films set in Canada
2021 films
Documentary films about dementia